Aaron G. Reardon is an American politician and lobbyist who served as the Snohomish County Executive from 2004 to 2013. First elected to the post in 2003, Reardon was sworn in as the youngest county executive in the United States. On February 21, 2013, Reardon announced his resignation effective May 31, 2013.

Prior to serving as Snohomish county executive, Reardon served as a Washington State Senator and a member of the state House of Representatives.

Education 
Reardon attended Mariner High School in Everett, Washington and lettered in football and swimming. His interest in competitive swimming led him to attend Central Washington University, but his swim career ended two months after his arrival. He earned dual Bachelor of Arts degrees in economics and public administration. During college, he volunteered on multiple statewide and local Democratic campaigns.

Career
After graduating from college, Reardon was selected for a post-graduate position with the Downtown Seattle Association, where he lobbied on behalf of Seattle businesses.

In 1998, aged 27, Reardon sought election to the Washington House of Representatives. Reardon won the general election with more than 55% of the vote.

Reardon was easily re-elected in 2000 and vacated the seat in 2002 to run for the Washington State Senate. In 2002, Reardon won election to the 38th Legislative District Senate seat, garnering 65 percent of the vote.

In 2003, Reardon won a three-way Democratic Primary election for the Snohomish County executive position. In the primary election, Reardon defeated former Democratic state senator Kevin Quigley. Reardon won the November general election garnering 52 percent of the countywide vote. Reardon positioned himself as a centrist Democrat, campaigning on a platform that called for decreasing taxes while implementing a long-term strategic growth plan specific to Snohomish County.

In 2007, Reardon retained his seat as County Executive defeating Republican Jack Turk. Reardon received 65 percent of the popular vote. In 2011, Reardon won a third term as county executive, defeating Republican Mike Hope, a Seattle police officer and member of the Washington State Legislature. In August 2012, a Skagit County judge dismissed a petition by a local blogger to recall Reardon because it had not been sworn in under oath.

On February 21, 2013, Reardon announced his resignation as county executive effective May 31, 2013. Reardon cited the ongoing financial toll on him and his family, regarding legal costs to continue to successfully defend against political allegations of improper use of county resources in his re-election campaign and an extra-marital affair.

Personal life 
Reardon and his wife Kate live in Everett, Washington with their two children.

References

Living people
Politicians from Everett, Washington
Central Washington University alumni
Democratic Party members of the Washington House of Representatives
Democratic Party Washington (state) state senators
1970s births
Date of birth missing (living people)